Tuğlu is a village in the Yüksekova District of Hakkâri Province in Turkey. The village is populated by Kurds of the Doski tribe and had a population of 197 in 2021.

The hamlets of Çayır and Karakaş are attached to Tuğlu.

References 

Villages in Yüksekova District
Kurdish settlements in Hakkâri Province